CBS News (formerly CBSN, also known as the CBS News Streaming Network) is an American streaming video news channel operated by the CBS News and Paramount Streaming divisions of Paramount Global. Launched on November 6, 2014, it features blocks of live, rolling news coverage, original programs, as well as encore airings of CBS News television programs.

It is available via the CBS News website and mobile app, apps on digital media players, co-owned Paramount+ and Pluto TV, and other free ad-supported streaming television (FAST) services.

The success of CBSN prompted CBS to launch similar services for sports and entertainment news—CBS Sports HQ and ET Live—in 2018, in conjunction with CBS Sports and Entertainment Tonight respectively. In December of that year, CBS also began extending the concept to its local television stations, launching streaming local news services in the markets of the network's owned-and-operated stations.

History 

Rumors that CBS News was preparing a 24-hour online news service were first reported by BuzzFeed in October 2013, and later confirmed by a CBS spokesperson who stated that the company was seeking "partners" for the service. Initial reports suggested that the service would consist of a linear, multi-platform streaming channel, featuring video content from other CBS News productions, along with other online-exclusive content; The New York Times likened the rumored format to an all-news radio station, combining pre-recorded video content with regular, live news updates. On May 15, 2014, CBS Corporation CEO Leslie Moonves confirmed in an interview with Bloomberg Television that the company was working on the service. Describing it as an "exciting alternative to cable news", he went on to say that "there is so much information that we get every day that doesn’t fit into a 22-minute newscast at 6:30 or CBS This Morning."

In October 2014, Capital New York reported that CBS had recently filed for trademarks on the name CBSN as a potential name for the service. It also reported that the content would take place in an informal newsroom setting, and that its interface would consist of a video player with a playlist on a sidebar, and feature social network integration. On November 5, 2014, during a Re/code conference in Dublin, CBS Interactive President Jim Lanzone announced that the service would officially launch on November 6, 2014. CBS News President David Rhodes explained that CBSN was not designed to compete directly with traditional pay-television news outlets, but to "create something that is native for connected devices", such as smartphones, tablets, and digital media players.

There was also an emphasis placed on targeting younger viewers, particularly those who are in places with little or no access to television, or those who do not subscribe to pay television at all. As opposed to CNNGo, a similarly formatted TV Everywhere service introduced by CNN prior to the launch of CBSN, CBSN is available at no charge and does not require users to authenticate with a subscription to a pay television provider. Rhodes argued that requiring authentication would hamper the service's viewership. CBSN uses commercial breaks similar to a conventional television channel; Amazon.com and Microsoft were among the service's initial advertisers.

In September 2021, CBS announced that CBSN would be rebranded under the CBS News name later in the year; the usage of a single brand for both broadcast and digital news content followed a reorganization that placed all of CBS' news efforts, including at the CBS-owned stations, under the purview of the CBS News division. The relaunch also saw the service relocate to a new set in the studio that had been vacated earlier in September by CBS This Morning, following its relaunch as the Times Square-based CBS Mornings. 

The new branding and studio premiered on January 24, 2022. It was also accompanied by a slate of new original programming, some of which acting as spin-offs or revivals of segments from other CBS News programs. They include the documentary franchise CBS Reports, The Dish (based on the segment from CBS Saturday Morning), Eye on America, Here Comes the Sun (which features segments and unaired material from CBS News Sunday Morning), On The Road with Steve Hartman, and the interview series Person-to-Person with Norah O'Donnell. While the service is primarily branded under the CBS News name, the service is officially referred to by CBS as the "CBS News Streaming Network".

Spinoffs 
The success of CBSN led CBS to launch CBS Sports HQ, a similar service devoted to sports news, on February 26, 2018. It provides sports news headlines, game previews, highlights and post-game analysis, and in-depth team, player and game statistics—utilizes resources from CBS Sports and its various digital properties.

ET Live, an entertainment and pop culture news service based on the CBS-produced syndicated program Entertainment Tonight, was launched on October 31, 2018. Developed in collaboration between CBS Interactive and ET distributor CBS Television Distribution, the service covers entertainment news headlines and breaking news, celebrity interviews, feature segments, behind-the-scenes and red carpet coverage, and trends in celebrity fashion, beauty and lifestyle. ET Live utilizes complementary standalone presenters complementary to those featured on Entertainment Tonight—some of whom serve as on-air contributors for the syndicated broadcast—with the parent series' main hosts and correspondents appearing in segments promoting stories scheduled to be shown on the on-air broadcast. In July 2022, ET Live was rebranded as Mixible, maintaining a similar scope, but with contributions by other Paramount properties.

CBS News Local 
Following the successful launches of CBSN and other streaming services, CBS created local, direct-to-consumer extensions of CBSN run by CBS Local Digital, in order to bring streaming anchored local and national news coverage across all CBS Television Stations on a 24/7 basis. The services stream existing CBSN national coverage—which is also used as an overnight and weekend backup feed for the CBSN Local outlets—in conjunction with live streams of local broadcasts and continuing coverage performed by the owned-and-operated stations. All services are supported by ad revenue. All CBSN Local services are available via Paramount+, CBS News, Pluto and local station websites and apps. The services are available nationally, and are not limited to their respective regions.

Pluto TV—which already carried the main CBSN service—began carrying CBSN New York and CBSN Los Angeles as well as ET Live and CBS Sports HQ on its lineup on November 12, 2019. The carriage came as the free ad-supported streaming television (FAST) service was in the process of becoming a sister property to CBS as part of CBS Corporation's merger with Viacom (which, earlier that year, had acquired Pluto TV from namesake parent Pluto Inc.), which was completed on December 4, 2019. On March 29, 2021, CBS-owned independent station KTXA in the Dallas–Fort Worth market began simulcasting CBSN Dallas-Ft. Worth on its second subchannel (21.2), becoming the first over-the-air simulcast of CBSN programming.

, CBS Local operates streaming services in 14 markets:

By early 2020, CBS had planned to launch CBSN Local services across the remaining markets featuring a news-producing owned-and-operated station that did not yet operate the streaming service.

CBS has not announced any plans to make CBS News Local available in three other markets with a CBS Television Stations property: Tacoma–Seattle (KSTW), Tampa–St. Petersburg (WTOG) and Atlanta (WUPA), all standalone CW owned-and-operated stations in markets where the CBS affiliates are owned by other companies (those stations being, respectively, Cox Media's KIRO, Tegna-owned WTSP, and Gray Television's WANF). In December 2019, it was first reported that CBS was looking to hire journalists for some of the aforementioned stations. The following month, CBS announced it was launching 10 p.m. weeknight newscasts at WKBD, WUPA, and WTOG hubbed out of KTVT, WCBS, and WFOR, respectively, and confirmed the newly hired multimedia journalists would help produce stories. The decision was due in part to the rising demand for newscasts from viewers and advertisers alike, and to the successful rollout of CBSN Local thus far. During the COVID-19 pandemic in the United States, WUPA's 10 p.m. newscast began airing a simulcast of WSBK's 10 p.m. newscast, after CBS suspended all operations at the CBS Broadcast Center in New York City. Five months later, the WSBK simulcast ended and KTVT began producing newscasts for WUPA. In July 2022, the WKBD, WUPA, and WTOG newscasts were replaced by new programs under the Now title, which feature a mixture of local segments, and national segments produced from KTVT; similar programs were concurrently launched on KSTW, WLNY-TV in New York, WSBK-TV in Boston, WPSG in Philadelphia, KTXA in Dallas–Fort Worth, KBCW in San Francisco, and WBFS-TV in Miami.

The CBSN Local services were rebranded under the CBS News name concurrently with the rebranding of the national service. CBS News and Stations co-president Wendy McMahon stated, in an interview with Variety coinciding with the rebranding, that CBS planned to produce 45,000 hours of local programming for the local streams by the end of 2022, including high school sports coverage. The services' names are incorporated into the titles of the Now newscasts in markets where CBS maintains a full news operation.

Programming 

According to Moonves, CBSN is designed primarily to leverage the resources of CBS News and other CBS-owned entities to "create exciting, highly competitive new services that meet evolving audience preferences for content consumption"; viewers can watch CBSN live as a linear service, or watch previous segments on-demand.

CBSN features anchored programming on weekdays from 5:00 a.m. to midnight Eastern Time (ET). The service draws content from CBS News along with other CBS properties, such as CBS Sports, CNET, Entertainment Tonight, and CBS affiliated television stations. It airs a looping broadcast of the CBS Morning News from 5:00 to 7:00 a.m. ET, morning show CBS News Mornings from 7:00 to 8:00 a.m. ET, and segments from both CBS Mornings (every weekdays) and CBS Saturday Morning (every Saturday) at 8:00 a.m. ET, one hour after the live East Coast television broadcast. CBSN also features the CBS Milestone segments, showcasing classic stories and interviews from CBS News programs such as Face the Nation. Both Face the Nation and CBS News Sunday Morning are carried on the channel in their entirety on a half-hour delay from the East Coast network feed and again during the West Coast late morning hours. Although marketed as featuring live programming, CBSN primarily uses hour-long "news wheels" updated throughout the day, but recorded programs can be interrupted to cover of breaking news and live events when needed. (The CBSN Local services maintain a similar programming structure.)

CBSN airs hour-long blocks of live news weekdays from 9:00 to 10:00 a.m., 1:00 to 2:00 p.m., and 7:00 to 8:00 p.m. ET, which is then incorporated into the "news wheel". On December 4, 2017, CBSN began streaming the "Western Edition" of the CBS Evening News weekdays at 10:00 p.m. ET, immediately following its West Coast television broadcast. In early 2018, Jeff Glor began inserting a specialized opening and closer for CBSN. Live coverage on weekends, beginning at noon ET, was anchored by Reena Ninan on Saturdays and Elaine Quijano on Sundays. Weekend coverage is broadcast on the CBS television network, under the CBS Weekend News title, during the timeslot previously occupied by the weekend edition of the CBS Evening News. Prior to the COVID-19 pandemic, during the overnight hours, live news updates were provided by CBS News Radio at the top of each hour.

Often during breaking news events, CBSN will also show the feed of the local CBS affiliate in the market of the breaking news and show the affiliate's live coverage of the event to complement their own main coverage with CBS News. CBSN resources have also since been leveraged by CBS's linear news programming; CBS Weekend News launched in May 2016 to replace the weekend editions of CBS Evening News, and is staffed primarily by CBSN anchors and other CBS News journalists.

CBSN carries original programs not available elsewhere, such as Red & Blue with Elaine Quijano and The Takeout with Major Garrett. (The audio feed of The Takeout is carried on select CBS News Radio affiliates, including WCBS radio in New York City.) Live reports are often followed by additional discussion with reporters in the field, giving more context and depth than other news outlets. Hosted interviews with analysts, newsmakers, and reporters are also part of the regular news coverage. Other original programming includes half-hour mini-documentaries Reverb and Speaking frankly with Adam Yamaguchi as an executive producer.

CBSN's programming was impacted by the temporary shutdown of the CBS Broadcast Center in early 2020, during the COVID-19 pandemic. For two weeks in March 2020, CBSN did not produce its regular programming, with CBSN Boston being simulcast on the national service for much of the day. During this time, CBS' stations in Boston, San Francisco, and Los Angeles produced national CBSN newscasts from their local facilities, and certain CBS News programs, such as CBS This Morning, were simulcast with the CBS network rather than delayed. The shutdown of the CBS Broadcast Center also limited CBSN New York's programming and forced WUPA's 10 p.m. newscast hubbed out of WCBS to become a simulcast of WSBK's 10 p.m. newscast as a substitute.

As part of the rebranding to the CBS News Streaming Network, CBS announced an expanded lineup of programming that includes revivals of Person to Person (hosted by CBS Evening News anchor Norah O'Donnell) and CBS Reports; Here Comes The Sun, featuring repurposed Sunday Morning segments; The Uplift, focused on inspirational stories; and programs based on the Eye on America and On the Road segments. Existing programming such as Red & Blue expanded the use of CBS News correspondents, and material from 60 Minutes and 48 Hours are featured in the service's prime time programming.

On-air staff 
At its launch, CBS assigned existing CBS News correspondents as anchors for CBSN's programs, but did not rule out hiring new correspondents specifically for CBSN in the future.

Notable current on-air staff 
Anne-Marie Green – CBS Morning News (weekdays 5:00 a.m. ET), CBS News Mornings (weekdays 7:00 a.m. ET), and weekdays 9:00 a.m. ET
Vladimir Duthiers –  Weekdays 9:00 a.m. ET
Tanya Rivero – Weekdays 1:00 p.m. ET
Tony Dokoupil - Weekdays 1:00 p.m. ET
Elaine Quijano – Red & Blue (Monday to Thursday 5:00 p.m. ET), Monday to Tuesday 7:00 p.m. ET

Notable former on-air staff 

 Margaret Brennan – Launch anchor; (now host of Face the Nation)
 Contessa Brewer – Anchor; (now at CNBC)
 Don Dahler – Launch anchor
 Josh Elliott – Anchor; (later presenter of First Responders Live) 
 Jeff Glor – Launch anchor; (now co-host of CBS Saturday Morning)
 Michelle Miller – Launch anchor; (now co-host of CBS Saturday Morning)
 Reena Ninan – Anchor (Tuesday to Friday 1:00 p.m. ET and Saturdays 12:00 noon ET)

Josh Elliott controversy 
On March 1, 2016, CBS announced that it had hired former ESPN, NBC Sports and Good Morning America anchor Josh Elliott as the lead anchor for CBSN. Of the hiring, CBS News President David Rhodes explained that Elliott needed an "outlet", going on to say that "we're going to need from him as much as he can bring in these different areas of reporting and anchoring. It's another reason it's the perfect place for him because it's kind of unlimited. We have some really hard-working people at CBSN, but we don't have enough of them." Elliott resigned on February 13, 2017, and CBS executives were caught off-guard by his abrupt announcement that he was to be promoted from CBSN.

References

External links 

CBS News Live
CBS News New York

CBS News
Paramount Streaming
Internet properties established in 2014
Internet television channels
Internet television streaming services
2014 establishments in New York (state)
24-hour television news channels in the United States